Nehemiah Day Sperry (July 10, 1827 – November 13, 1911) was a U.S. Representative from Connecticut.

Biography
Born in Woodbridge, Connecticut, Sperry was the third of six children of Enoch Sperry and Mary Atlanta (nee Sperry) Sperry. His eldest sibling Lucien Wells Sperry served as the 23rd mayor of New Haven, CT from 1866 to 1869. Nehemiah attended the common schools and a private school in New Haven. He engaged in agricultural pursuits and worked in a mill. He taught school for several years, and then became a partner in a building and contracting firm Smith & Sperry, among the top builders in New Haven after the Civil War.

He served as a member of the New Haven common council in 1853, and an Alderman in 1854. He served as Secretary of the State of Connecticut in 1855 and 1856.

Sperry served as delegate to the Republican National Conventions in 1856, 1864, and 1888. He served as member and secretary of the national and executive committees. He served as chairman of the Republican State committee for a number of years. He served as chairman of the recruiting committee of New Haven during the Civil War. He was appointed by President Lincoln in 1861 as postmaster of New Haven, and served until removed by President Cleveland in 1886. He was again postmaster from 1890 to 1894.

Sperry was elected as a Republican to the Fifty-fourth and to the seven succeeding Congresses (March 4, 1895 – March 3, 1911). He served as chairman of the Committee on Alcohol Liquor Traffic (Fifty-sixth through Sixty-first Congresses). He is considered the originator of the Rural Free Delivery system of the U. S. Mail, with the Rural Delivery Act which he introduced in 1895. He was not a candidate for renomination in 1910. His home, built in 1857 at 466 Orange Street in New Haven is listed among the Historic Buildings of Connecticut.

Death and burial
He died in New Haven, Connecticut, on November 13, 1911. He was interred in Evergreen Cemetery.

References

External links

1827 births
1911 deaths
Connecticut city council members
Secretaries of the State of Connecticut
Republican Party members of the United States House of Representatives from Connecticut
19th-century American politicians